Michael Frary (May 28, 1918 – August 30, 2005) was an American Modernist artist from Santa Monica, California, who was known for his interest in structural forms and architectural compositions, as well as for his Surrealist impulses. A versatile artist, Frary experimented with a range of mediums and constantly refined his approach to his subjects.

Early life and career

Frary graduated from Palm Beach High School in 1934 and was awarded an athletic scholarship from the University of Southern California (USC). During his time at USC, he became a champion swimmer and captain of the school's water polo team. In 1940, he graduated with a Bachelor of Architecture Degree. He obtained his Master of Fine Arts degree in painting the following year. At the outbreak of the Second World War, Frary joined the United States Navy. He was discharged as a Lieutenant when the war concluded in 1945 and returned to California. 

Frary subsequently worked as an assistant art director for Goldwyn Studios, Paramount, and Universal Studios. As a
member of the Society of Motion Picture Art Directors from 1946 to 1949, Frary assisted with the design of backdrops for films directed by Hollywood luminaries like Orson Welles. He began to teach night classes in painting at the University of California, Los Angeles (UCLA) and was soon offered a full-time teaching position at the school. While teaching at UCLA, Frary also taught at Los Angeles City College and the Chouinard Art Institute.

Texas Modernist Period 

In 1949, Michael relocated from California to Texas, after accepting the position of faculty chair at the McNay Art Museum in San Antonio. In addition to his teaching responsibilities, Frary continued his studies, taking classes at the Chicago Art Institute and at L' Académie de La Chaudière in Paris. These experiences gave him an appreciation for the forward-thinking work being produced by the European and American Modernists. Frary taught at the McNay Museum until 1952 and, while there, met Lola Marguerite Finch Mathewson "Peggy" Frary, whom he married in 1950.

When Frary was offered an assistant professor position at the University of Texas at Austin, he and his wife moved to a contemporary house in the northwest hills of Austin. They would remain there for the next five decades. Peggy Frary, who had a flair for entertaining, turned the home into a gathering place for Austin's burgeoning arts community. Frary was named professor of Art in 1970 and, upon his retirement in 1986, was named Professor Emeritus of Art.

Frary's legacy as a seminal Texas Modernist rests of his achievements during his early years at the University of Texas, when he worked alongside notables like Charles Umlauf, Everett Spruce, Ralph White, Kelly Fearing, William Lester, and Loren Mozley to promote Modernism in Texas. Frary and his compatriots helped usher Texas out of its artistic conservatism and into the national and international mainstream.

Frary continued to paint and exhibit his work until his death in 2005.

Select solo exhibitions 

During his career Frary received over one hundred seventy-five awards and purchase prizes and participated in over 200 one-man exhibitions.

1954
 Dalzell Hatfield Galleries, Los Angeles, California
 Betty McLean Gallery, Dallas, Texas
 Pan-American Galleries, San Antonio, Texas
1955
 Laguna Gloria Art Museum, Austin, Texas
1956
 Dalzell Hatfield Galleries, Los Angeles, Texas
 Fine Arts Department, San Antonio, Texas
1957
 Incarnate Word College, San Antonio, Texas
 Petite Gallery, New York, New York
1958
 Valley House Gallery, Dallas, Texas
1959
 Gallery of Modern Art, Fort Worth, Texas
 Laguna Gloria Art Museum, Austin, Texas
 Gallery of Modern Art, Fort Worth, Texas
1960
 Junior League Gallery, Houston, Texas
 Dalzell Hatfield Galleries, Los Angeles, California
 Janet Nessler Gallery, New York, New York
 Springfield Museum of Art, Springfield, Missouri
1961
 Art Department Gallery, San Angelo
College, San Angelo, Texas
1962
 McNay Art Institute, San Antonio, Texas
 Marion Koogler McNay Art Institute, San Antonio, Texas
1963
 Hill Country Arts Foundation, Ingram, Texas
 Peabody Museum, Salem, Massachusetts
1964
 Gallery of the Four Columns, Little Rock, Texas
 The Street Gallery, Little Rock, Arkansas
 Norton Gallery, St. Louis, Missouri
 Sul Ross State College Fine Arts Gallery, Alpine, Texas
 San Angelo College, San Angelo, Texas
1965
 Shook Carrington Gallery, San Antonio, Texas
1966
 Valley House Gallery, Dallas, Texas
 Dalzell Hatfield Galleries, Los Angeles, California
1967
 Artists West of the Mississippi Exhibition, Colorado Springs Fine Arts Center, Colorado Springs, Colorado
 Missouri Southern University Art Department, Joplin, Missouri
1968
 Concordia College, Austin, Texas
 Valley House Gallery, Dallas, Texas
 Shook Carrington Gallery, San Antonio, Texas
 Frary-Lester Show at University Art Museum, University of Texas at Austin
1970
 Main Place Gallery, One Main Place, Dallas, Texas
 Parkcrest Gallery, 5408 Parkcrest, Austin, Texas
 TFAA traveling Michael Frary Exhibition: Sul Ross State College, Alpine, Texas; the University of Texas at El Paso, El Paso, TX; Odessa College, Odessa, Texas; Angelina College, Lufkin, Texas; Kilgore College, Kilgore, Texas; McAllen State Bank Patrons of Art, McAllen, Texas; Guadalajara, Mexico
1971
 University of Texas at El Paso, El Paso, Texas
 Odessa College, Odessa, Texas
 Sul Ross State University, Alpine, Texas
 Parkcrest Gallery, Austin, Texas
1973
 Laguna Gloria Art Museum, Austin, Texas
 Meredith Long Gallery, Houston, Texas
 Marion Koogler McNay Art Institute, San Antonio, Texas 
 Dallas Public Library, Dallas, Texas
1975
 University of Texas at Dallas, Dallas, Texas
 Texas Lutheran College, Seguin, Texas
1977
 Abilene Fine Arts Museum, Abilene, Texas
1979
 Galveston Art Center on the Strand, Galveston, Texas
1984
 Santa Fe East, Santa Fe, New Mexico

Select museums and public collections 

 Los Angeles County Museum, Exposition Park, Los Angeles, California.
 Smithsonian Institution, Washington, D.C.
 Butler Institute of American Art, Youngstown, Ohio.
 Santa Barbara Museum of Art, Santa Barbara, California.
 Witte Memorial Museum, San Antonio, Texas
 Laguna Gloria Art Museum, Austin, Texas
 Dallas Museum of Fine Arts, Dallas, Texas
 Museum of Fine Arts of Houston, Texas
 Springfield Art Museum, Springfield, Missouri
 Janet Nessler Gallery, New York, New York
 Knoedler Gallery, New York, New York
 Black Tulip Gallery, Dallas, Texas
 Valley House Gallery, Dallas, Texas
 The University of Texas Student Union, Austin, Texas
 Beverly Fairfax Community Center, Los Angeles, California
 Meadows Building, Dallas, Texas
 D. D. Feldman Collection, Dallas, Texas
 Ted Weiner Collection, Fort Worth, Texas
 Coca-Cola Company, New York, New York
 Grumbacher Collection, New York, New York
 Bocour Collection, New York, New York
 Virginia Museum of Fine Arts, Richmond, Virginia
 Phillips Petroleum Company, Bartlesville, Oklahoma
 Dallas Morning News, Dallas, Texas
 National Gallery of Art, Washington, D.C. 
 One Rockefeller Plaza, New York, New York
 State University of New York at Binghamton, Binghamton, New York
 Bureau of Reclamation, Washington, D.C.

References

Biography
Biography
Biography
Biography
Biography

1918 births
2005 deaths
20th-century American painters
American male painters
21st-century American painters
21st-century American male artists
USC School of Architecture alumni
University of California, Los Angeles faculty
University of Texas faculty
Artists from Santa Monica, California
Alumni of the Académie de la Grande Chaumière
USC Roski School of Fine Arts alumni
United States Navy personnel of World War II
United States Navy officers
Military personnel from California
20th-century American male artists